Anolis poncensis (commonly known as Ponce small-fanned anole, Ponce anole and dryland grass anole;) is a species of lizard of the family of Dactyloidae. The species is endemic to Puerto Rico. It was first identified in Ponce, in the hills three miles east of the city. The Puerto Rico Department of Natural and Environmental Resources considers it a "vulnerable species".

Description
The body of this anole is longer and more slender than other grass Anoles. It has distinguishing brownish dorsum, greenish sides, blue eyes, a small white dewlap, a short pale lateral line, and a number of black spots behind the eyes. Males grow up to 44 mm and females up to 40 mm.

Distribution
This species is endemic to Puerto Rico. Its distribution is rather small, being limited to the arid and semi-arid western half of the southern coast of the island. It was identified and catalogued in 1902 by Leonhard Stejneger, a curator with the Division of Reptiles and Batrachians of the United States National Museum.

Etymology
Its species name, consisting of "ponce" plus the Latin suffix -nsis, was given in reference to the place of its discovery, the city of Ponce. Its discovery and documentation were originally published in Stejneger, 1904: "The herpetology of Porto Rico".

See also

Fauna of Puerto Rico
List of amphibians and reptiles of Puerto Rico

Notes

References

External links
 Anolis poncensis. Distribution of Anolis poncensis within Puerto Rico. 
 CaribHerp: Amphibians and reptiles of Caribbean Islands. Caribbean Herpetology. 2016. Accessed 14 June 2016. Map illustrating the distribution of Anolis poncensis within Puerto Rico. 
 Anolis poncensis STEJNEGER 1904 (accepted name). Catalogue of Life: 2011 Annual Checklist, describing A. poncensis as belonging to the "Family Polychrotidae".

Further reading
 Brandley, M.C. & De Queiroz, K. 2004. Phylogeny, ecomorphological evolution, and historical biogeography of the Anolis cristatellus series. Herpetological Monographs 18: 90-126.
 Grant, C. 1932. Herpetological notes from the Puerto Rico area. Jour. Dept. Agric. Puerto Rico 16(1): 161-165
 Nicholson, Kirten E.; Brian I. Crother, Craig Guyer & Jay M. Savage 2012. It is time for a new classification of anoles (Squamata: Dactyloidae). Zootaxa 3477: 1–108
 Poe, S. 2004. Phylogeny of anoles. Herpetological Monographs 18: 37-89.
 Poe, S. 2013. 1986 Redux: New genera of anoles (Squamata: Dactyloidae) are unwarranted. Zootaxa 3626 (2): 295–299.
 Rivero, J.A. 1978. Los anfibios y reptiles de Puerto Rico. M. Pareja Montana, 16, Barcelona, España: x + 152 + 148pp.
 Schmidt, K.P. 1928. Scientific Survey of Porto Rico and the Virgin Islands: Amphibians and land reptiles of Porto Rico, with a list of those reported from the Virgin Islands. New York Academy of Sciences 10 (1):160 pp.
 Schwartz, A. and Henderson, R.W. 1985. A guide to the identification of the amphibians and reptiles of the West Indies exclusive of Hispaniola. Milwaukee Public Museum, 165 pp.
 Schwartz,A. & Henderson,R.W. 1991. Amphibians and Reptiles of the West Indies. University of Florida Press, Gainesville, 720 pp.
 Stejneger, L. 1904. The herpetology of Porto Rico. Rept. United States National Museum. 1902: 549-724.
 Werning, H. 2012. Zwischen Anolis und Cycluren: Unterwegs auf Puerto Rico. Reptilia (Münster) 17 (95): 100-109.

Anoles
Endemic fauna of Puerto Rico
Lizards of the Caribbean
Reptiles of Puerto Rico
Ponce, Puerto Rico
Reptiles described in 1902
Taxa named by Leonhard Stejneger